The 2019 Cupa României  was the 115th season of Romania`s national rugby union cup competition, reserved for club teams participating in the CEC Bank SuperLiga. Starting with this edition the number of participating teams has decreased to seven, due to CSM București dissolving before the start of the new season meaning all of CSM`s matches are to be cancelled.

Teams

Groups 

These are the regular season group classifications:

 

 Note - CSM București have withdrawn from the competition before the 2019 Cupa României started so all of their matches will be cancelled.

Fixtures & Results of Group A

Round 1

Round 2

Round 3

Round 4

Round 5

Round 6

Fixtures & Results of Group B

Round 1

Round 2

Round 3

Round 4

Round 5

Round 6

First place final

References

External links
  www.super-liga.ro  – Official website

2019–20 in Romanian rugby union
Rugby union competitions in Romania